Another Day is an American situation comedy television series starring David Groh and Joan Hackett that aired for four episodes on CBS from April 8 to April 29, 1978.

Synopsis
Don Gardner is a rather traditional middle-class man who wants to support his family on his income alone. The Gardners finances, however, dictate that his wife Ginny also take a job, although even with her working full-time there never seems to be enough money to make ends meet. Don and Ginny have two children; teenaged Kelly is their uninhibited and outgoing daughter and 12-year-old Mark is their shy son. Dons complaining mother, Olive, lives with the family and spends most of her time criticizing everyone around her. The Gardners struggle to be a normal, middle-class family, but Olive and the children always manage to make life complicated.

Cast
 David Groh . . . Don Gardner
 Joan Hackett . . . Ginny Gardner
 Hope Summers . . . Olive Gardner
 Lisa Lindgren . . . Kelly Gardner
 Al Eisenmann . . . Mark Gardner

Production
James Komack created Another Day and was its executive producer. Paul Mason and George Kirgo produced it. Episode directors were Burt Brinckerhoff, Hal Cooper, Nick Havinga, and Gary Shimokawa. Episode writers were Charlie Hauck, Dinah Kirgo, Julie Kirgo, Carl Kleinschmitt, Lynn Phillips, and Bill Taub. Paul Williams wrote and sang the shows theme song.

Broadcast history
Another Day premiered on April 8, 1978. It drew very low ratings, and CBS cancelled it after the broadcast of its fourth and final episode on April 29, 1978. It aired on Saturday at 9:00 p.m. throughout its brief run.

Episodes
Source:

References

External links
Another Day opening credits on YouTube
1978 CBS promo on YouTube for the April 8, 1978, premieres of The Ted Knight Show and Another Day
1978 CBS promo for the April 8, 1978, premiere of Another Day on YouTube

CBS original programming
1978 American television series debuts
1978 American television series endings
1970s American sitcoms
English-language television shows
Television shows set in Los Angeles